Subnormal may refer to:
Subnormal body temperature, a common term for hypothermia
Subnormal operator, a type of operator in operator theory in mathematics
Subnormal number, another name for a denormal number in floating point arithmetic
Subnormal profit, which is negative profit (economics)
Subnormal series, a type of subgroup series in group theory in mathematics
Subnormal subgroup, a type of subgroup in group theory in mathematics
The projection of a normal of a curve onto the x-axis; see subtangent